The Nokia 6275i is a CDMA mobile phone.  Basically, it is a "candybar" version of the Nokia 6265.  It has a 2.0-megapixel camera with flash, and a portrait mirror.  The phone itself has 21 MB of memory, but it can use microSD cards to expand the memory capacity to 2 GB.  It uses the Nokia Series 40 OS (3rd Edition), and can connect to other devices using infrared, USB, and Bluetooth technology.  The screen has a resolution of 240x320.

The video recorder comes by default with QCIF (176 × 144) capability and can record as much video as can be stored on the micro SD card.  The default h.263 codec format uses approx 1 MB to 1½ MB of memory for each minute of recorded video.  The format can be switched to a better MPEG-4 by using service centre software to adjust the internal settings.

Java applications are supported, and if the carrier has disabled these, they too can be allowed by adjusting the internal settings.  
Software such as Opera Mini, Google Maps, Flurry, and more, will run fine once the phones settings allow it to run Java MIDLets.

Camera is sufficient for good quality website photos.  Since the camera does not do very good white adjustment or contrast adjustment, the user might find it helpful to use photo software to auto adjust the photos and make them look much better.

The earplug is a 4 segment type.  This is rarely available as a third part product that consumers can buy.  This can be found sold by third parties and if the user is inventive, they can make an adapter to allow a line-in to car stereos and home stereos.  The earplug connection is also used as an antenna for the built-in FM Radio, however, when the earplug connection is in use, the Bluetooth earpiece function is disabled.

The FM Radio can also use accessories connected to the bottom port of the phone as an antenna, such as the wired stereo earpiece.  It can also play back through the phone's speaker.

This phone can be found in retail stores for around $200 as of September 2007.  In Canada it is available as a Virgin Mobile, Bell Mobility, SaskTel Mobility, Solo Mobile & President's Choice Mobile product. The only cell phone carrier to date in the United States to offer this product is Cricket, a Leap Communications company. The units that Bell Mobility and Solo Mobile sell are custom-made: it is impossible to configure a custom ringtone on these phones. However, they can be hacked if one has both the Nokia USB cable (sold separately) and the Nokia Diego software.

There is a hack for this phone which enables the internal GPS to function with a Java-based GPS program. Essentially, the 6275i can function as a GPS unit with maps.

References

External links 
 Nokia's page on the Nokia 6275i

6275i